Mayalokam is a 1945 Telugu-language film produced and directed by Gudavalli Ramabrahmam under the Sarathi Films banner. It stars Akkineni Nageswara Rao and S. Varalakshmi, with music composed by Galipenchala Narasimha Rao. The film is the debut of veteran actor and producer Padmanabham. The film was successful at the box office.

Plot
Sambaripura King, Kambhoja Raju (Govindarajula Subba Rao) has seven wives and six children (from his first six wives). When his youngest wife, Manikyamba (Kannamba) is pregnant, Rajaguru (M. C. Raghavan) predicts that her son would be the next king. Upset at this, the eldest wife ("Radio" Bhanumathi), who feels that her son Navabhoja Raju (C. S. R) is a natural choice, plots with the other wives and poisons the mind of the king, who banishes Manikyamba from the kingdom.

Lord Siva (Vedantam Raghavayya), in the guise of a tribal, takes her to a tribal colony in the forest, where Manikyamba delivers a boy, who grows into a handsome youth, Sarabandi Raju (Akkineni Nageswara Rao). The repentant Kambhoja becomes sick and his six sons set out to bring medicine to cure his illness. Sarabandi comes to the kingdom to reunite his parents. He too goes in search of the medicine for his father. With the help of Rathnagandhi (Santhakumari) and Yojanagandhi (M. V. Rajamma), whom he meets on way, he gets the potion that can cure his father. He also gets his six brothers freed from the captivity of the vicious Rangasani (S. Varalakshmi).

Sarabandi marries Rathnagandhi and Yojanagandhi and brings them with him. The six wives realize their folly, Manikyamba returns to the palace and Sarabandi Raju is crowned as king.

Cast
 Akkineni Nageswara Rao as Sarabandi Raju		
 S. Varalakshmi as Rangasani
 Govindarajula Subba Rao as Kambhoja Raju 	
 C. S. R. as Navabhoja Raju
 Vedantam Raghavayya as Lord Siva				
 Padmanabham
 M. C. Raghavan as Rajugaru	
 Kannamba as Manikyamba
 Santha Kumari as Rathnagandhi	
 M. V. Rajamma as Yojanagandhi
 Radio Bhanumathi as Kambhoja Raju's eldest wife

Soundtrack

Music composed by Galipenchala Narasimha Rao. Music released on Audio Company.

Box office
The film ran for more than 100 days in 4 centers in Andhra Pradesh.

References

External links
Mayalokam film at IMDb.

1945 films
1940s Telugu-language films
Indian black-and-white films
Indian musical films
1945 musical films
Films scored by Gali Penchala Narasimha Rao